Ibrahim Sangaré (born 2 December 1997) is an Ivorian professional footballer who plays as a defensive midfielder for PSV and the Ivory Coast national team.

Club career
After starting his youth career with Ivorian clubs Tout Puissant Koumassi and AS Denguélé, Sangaré debuted for Toulouse in a 0–0 tie with Angers on 22 October 2016.

PSV
On 28 September 2020, Sangaré joined PSV Eindhoven on a five-year deal.

On 3 December 2021, Sangaré was named the Eredivisie player of the month for November 2021. He was also included in the team of the month for October 2021 and December 2021 respectively.

On 17 April 2022, Sangaré started in PSV's triumph over rivals Ajax in the KNVB Cup Final.

On 7 August 2022, amid interest from several top European clubs, PSV announced that Sangaré had extended his contract with the club until 2027. On 16 August 2022, Sangaré scored in a 2–2 draw away to Rangers in the first leg of their UEFA Champions League play-off round match.

International career
Sangaré represented Ivory Coast U20 at the 2015 Toulon Tournament, and the Ivory Coast U23s in 2 friendlies.

Career statistics

Club

International

Scores and results list Ivory Coast's goal tally first.

Honours
PSV
KNVB Cup: 2021–22
Johan Cruyff Shield: 2021, 2022

Ivory Coast U23
Africa U-23 Cup of Nations runner-up: 2019

Individual
Eredivisie Player of the Month: November 2021
Eredivisie Team of the Month: November 2021

References

External links

 Profile at the PSV Eindhoven website
 
 
 
 

1997 births
Living people
Association football midfielders
Ivorian footballers
Ivory Coast international footballers
Ivory Coast under-20 international footballers
Toulouse FC players
PSV Eindhoven players
Ligue 1 players
Ligue 2 players
Championnat National 3 players
Eredivisie players
Ivorian expatriate footballers
Ivorian expatriate sportspeople in France
Ivorian expatriate sportspeople in the Netherlands
Expatriate footballers in France
Expatriate footballers in the Netherlands
2019 Africa Cup of Nations players
2021 Africa Cup of Nations players